William 'Chege' Ouma is a Kenyan former footballer.

International goals

Scores and results list Kenya's goal tally first

References

1945 births
Living people
People from Coast Province
Kenyan footballers
Association footballers not categorized by position
Gor Mahia F.C. players
Kenya international footballers